Agnes Neuerer was an Austrian luger who competed in the late 1950s. She won the bronze medal in the women's singles event at the 1959 FIL World Luge Championships in Villard-de-Lans, France.

References

External links
Hickok sports information on World champions in luge and skeleton.

Austrian female lugers
Possibly living people
Year of birth missing
20th-century Austrian women